The 1888–89 season was Notts County's first season in the Football League which had just been founded. Because of this Notts County became one of the founder members of the Football League. They finished in 11th position level on points with bottom of the table Stoke and were re-elected.

Final league table

Key: P = Matches played; W = Matches won; D = Matches drawn; L = Matches lost; F = Goals for; A = Goals against; GA = Goal average; Pts = Points

Results

Notts County's score comes first

Legend

Football League

FA Cup

Appearances

See also
1888–89 in English football
List of Notts County F.C. seasons

References

Notts County F.C. seasons
Notts